Padley is a surname. Notable people with the surname include:

Barry Padley (born 1949), Australian rules footballer
Bill Padley (born 1961), British record producer and songwriter
George Padley (1882–1965), British footballer
James Sandby Padley (1792–1881), British surveyor, architect and civil engineer
Marcus Padley, British stockbroker and writer
Walter Padley (1916–1984), British politician
William Padley (1842–1904), British cricketer